Viburnum × jackii (Jack's viburnum) is a viburnum of cultivated origin. It is a hybrid between Viburnum lentago and Viburnum prunifolium. It is a deciduous shrub intermediate between its parents, growing to 8 m tall.

References

jackii
Interspecific plant hybrids